Conrad Nicholai Weis Laursen (born 11 May 2006) is a Danish racing driver scheduled to compete in the European Le Mans Series with AF Corse. He is the 2020 Danish F4 champion.

Early career

Lower formulae

2020 
In 2020, Laursen made his single-seater debut, competing in the F4 Danish Championship with FSP Racing. He started the campaign off strongly, taking a triple of podiums, which included his maiden win in car racing, at Jyllandsringen. The same results followed at Padborg Park, where the Dane once again finished second, third and first in the races. Having taken a sole podium in the third event, Laursen was declared as champion following the cancellation of the season finale, scheduled to take place at Sturup Raceway.

2021 
The Dane progressed to the Italian F4 Championship the following year, driving for Prema Powerteam. Starting his year by finishing fifth in the season opener at Le Castellet, Laursen struggled the following round in Misano, being forced to retire from two races. Consistent points would come at Vallelunga and Imola, before the Dane went without a points finish at the Red Bull Ring. Having scored a pair of top-ten results as well as a fastest lap at Monza, Laursen finished ninth in the overall championship, whilst losing out narrowly on the rookie title to Nikita Bedrin owing to a spin in the final race.

2022 
Having started 2022 by racing in two events of the F4 UAE Championship, where he scored a pair of podiums, Laursen returned to the Italian and ADAC F4 series for his main campaign, once again competing with Prema, this time alongside Andrea Kimi Antonelli, Rafael Câmara, Charlie Wurz and James Wharton. His season in the former began slowly, with the first two rounds yielding a mere three points finishes, before the Dane scored his first podium in the series, finishing second in Race 3 at Spa-Francorchamps. Another podium would follow at the Red Bull Ring, however that round would see Laursen's final points finish of the campaign, which meant that he classified eleventh in the standings by the end of the year. In the German championship, Laursen scored a podium during the opening round, having come back from a 19th-placed grid slot during Race 3, before struggling to achieve major results at the Hockenheimring, notably dropping to ninth from reverse-grid pole in the final race. Laursen bounced back emphatically during the next event in Zandvoort, where, having taken third place in Race 1, he held off teammate Antonelli to take his first victory in the championship on Sunday, finishing 58 hundredths of a second ahead of the Italian. Despite leaving the series after round four, where he made another appearance on the rostrum, Laursen ended up sixth in the drivers' standings.

Sportscar career

2022 - First appearance 
Laursen made his first appearance in the world of GT racing in the Ferrari Challenge Europe, scoring a pair of top five finishes at the Hockenheimring in 2022.

2023 - Debut in ELMS 
For the 2023 season, Laursen switched to sportscar racing on a full-time basis, teaming up with his father Johnny and fellow Dane Nicklas Nielsen in the Asian Le Mans Series at the start of the year, before racing with the same teammates in the European Le Mans Series during the summer, driving for AF Corse in the GT category of both championships.

Karting record

Karting career summary

Complete CIK-FIA Karting European Championship results 
(key) (Races in bold indicate pole position) (Races in italics indicate fastest lap)

Racing record

Racing career summary 

* Season still in progress.

Complete F4 Danish Championship results 
(key) (Races in bold indicate pole position) (Races in italics indicate fastest lap)

Complete Italian F4 Championship results 
(key) (Races in bold indicate pole position) (Races in italics indicate fastest lap)

Complete ADAC Formula 4 Championship results 
(key) (Races in bold indicate pole position) (Races in italics indicate fastest lap)

Complete Asian Le Mans Series results 
(key) (Races in bold indicate pole position) (Races in italics indicate fastest lap)

Complete European Le Mans Series results
(key) (Races in bold indicate pole position; results in italics indicate fastest lap)

References

External links 

 

2006 births
Living people
Danish racing drivers
Sportspeople from Copenhagen
Danish F4 Championship drivers
ADAC Formula 4 drivers
Italian F4 Championship drivers
UAE F4 Championship drivers
Asian Le Mans Series drivers
European Le Mans Series drivers
Prema Powerteam drivers
AF Corse drivers
Karting World Championship drivers
Ferrari Challenge drivers